Fictionist is an American alternative rock band from Provo, Utah, United States, with origins in Salt Lake City and Sacramento. The band consists of Stuart Maxfield (lead vocals, bass guitar), Robbie Connolly (lead vocals, guitar), Brandon Kitterman (guitar, bass guitar), and Aaron Anderson (drums). They have toured nationally and have opened for acts including Imagine Dragons, Vampire Weekend, Neon Trees, Young the Giant, and Shiny Toy Guns.

History

Background and overview
The band began in its earliest formation as Good Morning Maxfield in 2007 and released an eponymous album under that name. Fictionist formed in their current configuration to release their first album Invisible Hand in 2009.

Invisible Hand (2009)
Fictionist released their first studio album, Invisible Hand, in January 2009.  The band won an Independent Music Award for Best Pop/Rock Song for the eponymous single "Invisible Hand". Another song, "Noisy Birds", was featured in Seasons 6 and 7 of PBS's program Roadtrip Nation.

Lasting Echo (2010)
Lasting Echo unveiled the band's first official music video which was directed and animated by artist Eric Power. The music video for the single "Blue-eyed Universe" was featured at the 2010 Tucson Film & Music Festival.

Lasting Echo was selected by Paste magazine to be the April 2010 VIP bonus album.  In 2011, they received another Independent Music Award for Best Pop/Rock Song for "Blue-Eyed Universe" from their second album, Lasting Echo.  The album cover to Lasting Echo was also nominated for Pop/Rock Album and Best Album Art.

On February 15, 2011 it was announced on Late Night with Jimmy Fallon that Fictionist would be one of 16 bands to participate in the Rolling Stone Magazine "Do You Wanna Be A Rock 'n Roll Star?" Contest.  During Round 2 they recorded two new tracks with producer David Bendeth (Paramore, Bring Me The Horizon, Kaiser Chiefs).  They were eliminated in Round 4 of the competition as semifinalists.

Fictionist EP with Atlantic Records (2011-2014)
Fictionist signed with Atlantic Records and released a 6-track EP titled Fictionist - EP in September 2011.

In 2012 the band announced that it had recorded an album produced by Grammy nominated producer Ron Aniello (Bruce Springsteen, Lifehouse) and engineered by Nick DiDia (Pearl Jam, Bruce Springsteen, Stone Temple Pilots) for Atlantic Records.  The new album was recorded at the historic Hollywood Sunset Sound Recorders.  The band also announced that they used a guitar which Elvis Presley played on one of his albums during the album recording sessions.

Fictionist supported Imagine Dragons on two occasions in 2013 and 2014.  Robbie Connolly also appears in the Imagine Dragons music video for "On Top of the World".

FICTIONIST and Free Spirit EP (2014-2016)
Following artistic disagreements with the label and a sense of stifled creativity, Fictionist ultimately chose not to release their final recordings with Atlantic Records.   Instead they recorded a new independent self-titled album produced by Nate Pyfer (Kaskade, The Moth & the Flame, Mideau). FICTIONIST was released in Provo, UT, on October 3, 2014, and nationally on October 7.

After parting ways with Atlantic Records, Fictionist took advantage of their new freedom to include new and unconventional sounds in their tracks.  Robbie Connelly began to actively compose and sing along with Stuart Maxfield, an arrangement the band had not had previously.

In 2015, they toured with Mates of State and on a summer east-coast tour with Neon Trees. They scheduled a 2015 Tour to coincide with the "An Intimate Night With Neon Trees" Tour on various dates. Concerts with the Neon Trees ran between June 13 through July 26 finishing up in Boston, MA at the Paradise Rock Club, before heading to Salt Lake City, UT for a show with the Kills & Metz for the Twilight Concert Series.

On July 29, 2016, Fictionist released a four track EP titled Free Spirit.  Toward the end of the year they toured in central and south-western United States with Minnesota indie rock band Step Rockets.

Sleep Machine (2017-present)
On May 12, 2017 Fictionist released a ten track album titled Sleep Machine and started a west coast tour with Eric Robertson accompanying the band on the keyboard.  Sleep Machine is a shorter album with more interconnected songs compared to previous releases by Fictionist.

Media
Fictionist was the subject of a The Song That Changed My Life episode on BYUtv.

Band members

Current members
 Stuart Maxfield – lead vocals, bass (2007–present)
 Robbie Connelly – lead vocals, guitar, keyboards (2007–present)
 Brandon Kitterman – lead guitar, keyboards, backing vocals (2007–present)
 Aaron Anderson – drums (2007–present)

Past members
 Jacob Jones – keyboard (2007–2015)
 Spencer Harrison – bass (2008–2010)
 Jeremy Bowen (2007–2009) (Good Morning Maxfield)

Timeline

Discography

Studio albums
 Invisible Hand (2009)
 Lasting Echo (2010)
 Fictionist (2014)
 Sleep Machine (2017)

Extended plays
 Fictionist - EP (Atlantic, 2011)
 "Free Spirit" (2016)

Awards

2015 Salt Lake City Weekly Best Band Winner

References

External links 
 

Musical groups established in 2007
Provo, Utah
Indie pop groups from Utah
2007 establishments in Utah